Caledonian Road & Barnsbury railway station in the London Borough of Islington in North London is on the North London line and is in Travelcard Zone 2. The station and all trains serving it are operated by London Overground.

History

The station opened in 1870 as "Barnsbury" replacing the 1852 Caledonian Road station which was slightly west of the present site. Barnsbury was renamed "Caledonian Road & Barnsbury" in 1893.

Between 14 May 1979 and 11 May 1985 the station was served by the Crosstown Linkline diesel multiple unit service between to Camden Road and North Woolwich. 

After the reopening the work continued until May 2011 with a reduced service and none on Sundays.

Design
The station entrance on Offord Street leads to the old westbound platform (until February 2010) from which a footbridge gives access to the newer island platforms, numbered 2 and 3, probably to distinguish them from the old platform 1. There is a footpath, with Oyster readers, from Caledonian Road to the entrance.

Location
London Buses routes 17, 91, 259, 274 and night route N91 serve the station.

Services
The typical off-peak weekday, Saturday and Sunday service at the station in trains per hour is
 4 westbound to Richmond
 4 westbound to Clapham Junction
 8 eastbound to Stratford

References

External links 

 Excel file displaying National Rail station usage information for 2005/06 

Railway stations in the London Borough of Islington
Former North London Railway stations
Railway stations in Great Britain opened in 1850
Railway stations served by London Overground
Barnsbury